MTV's Top Pop Group is a competitive reality television show consisting of nine pop groups looking to be the next Top pop group. The show aired on MTV and was hosted by Mario Lopez. The judges were Brian Friedman (former choreographer and judge from So You Think You Can Dance), Michelle Williams (from Destiny's Child) and Taboo (from The Black Eyed Peas). Marianela Pereyra was the show's backstage correspondent. The casting special aired on August 28, 2008 the show premiered on September 11, 2008. Only 4 weeks after the premiere, the series finale was aired suddenly on October 2, 2008.

Groups
 Jazmin
 NJ5ive
 Concrete Rose
 Las Caprice
 Ju-Taun
 3 Daze
 Mosaic
 LS3
 S1

Rankings

Performances
Week 1:
 NJ5ive - Forever by Chris Brown
 3 Daze - Mercy by Duffy
 LS3 - What You Got by Colby O'Donis
 Jazmin - Disturbia by Rihanna
 Mosaic - Got Me Going by Day26
 Concrete Rose - I Kissed a Girl by Katy Perry
 S1 - Stronger by Kanye West
 Las Caprice - Damaged by Danity Kane
 Ju-Tuan - Beautiful Girls by Sean Kingston

Week 2:
 Ju-Tuan - Closer by Ne-Yo
 Jazmin - Pocketful of Sunshine by Natasha Bedingfield
 S1 - Got Money by Lil' Wayne Feat T-Pain
 Las Caprice - Break the Ice by Britney Spears
 Mosaic - Makes Me Wonder by Maroon 5
 Concrete Rose - American Boy by Estelle and Kanye West
 3 Daze - Tattoo by Jordin Sparks
 NJ5ive - Sexy Can I by Ray J

Week 3:
 Mosaic - Let's Get It Started by The Black Eyed Peas
 Las Caprice - SOS by Rihanna
 Ju-Tuan - Let Me Love You by Mario
 Jazmin - Bleeding Love by Leona Lewis
 NJ5ive - Confessions by Usher
 S1 - Put On by Young Jeezy
 Concrete Rose - Big Girls Don't Cry by Fergie

Week 4:
 Las Caprice - No One by Alicia Keys
 Mosaic - Kiss Kiss by Chris Brown
 Ju-Tuan - Leavin' by Jesse McCartney
 Jazmin - Say It Right by Nelly Furtado
 NJ5ive - With You by Chris Brown
 S1 - Smack That by Akon

External links
 MTV's Top Pop Group
 Official Mosaic website

2000s American reality television series
2008 American television series debuts
2008 American television series endings
MTV original programming
Singing talent shows